

Events

January events
 January 6 – A computer-controlled Washington Metro train overruns the platform at the Shady Grove station, colliding with a parked train and fatally injuring the operator.

February events
 February 4 – The first two British passenger train operating companies begin operation of their service franchises as part of the privatisation of British Rail: South West Trains (part of the Stagecoach Group) and Great Western Trains (Great Western Holdings).
 February 9  - 1996 Secaucus train collision: A southbound New Jersey Transit train (Train #1254) bound for Hoboken Terminal collides nearly head-on with a northbound NJ Transit train (Train #1107) heading to Suffern. 3 People are killed.
 February 10 – Woodlands Extension of the MRT North South line in Singapore opened, adding six new stations to the current network.
 February 16 – 1996 Maryland train collision: A Chicago bound Amtrak train, the Capitol Limited, collides with a MARC commuter train bound for Washington, killing 11 people.
 February 19 – Approximately 1,000 passengers are trapped in the Channel Tunnel when two Eurostar trains break down due to electronic failures caused by snow and ice.
 February 24 – The three British trainload freight companies, Loadhaul, Mainline Freight and Transrail, are acquired by North & South Railways, a subsidiary of Wisconsin Central, as part of the privatisation of British Rail.

March events
 March 4 – Weyauwega, Wisconsin derailment: A Wisconsin Central freight train derails on a broken switch in Weyauwega, Wisconsin. The derailment forces the evacuation of the entire town until March 20 while fire crews work to control the resulting blaze.
 March 15 – Amtrak selects the "American Flyer" design developed by Bombardier and Alstom, based on the TGV trains of France, as the design model for its Acela rolling stock.
 March 18 – SNCF begins a construction project to renew the track ballast on the Paris-Lyon TGV line; the project is expected to last through 2006.
 March 28 
 Muzha Line of Taipei Mass Rapid Transit, the first rapid transit line of Taiwan, opens.
 Freight services between Higashi-Yokoze freight terminal and Shin-Akitsu on the Seibu Ikebukuro Line in Japan are discontinued.
 March – Government of Guatemala suspends operation on the entire  Ferrocarriles de Guatemala network.

April events
 April 14 – The British trainload freight company North & South Railways Ltd becomes EWS.
 April 21 – The Jokela rail accident, a derailment in thick fog, kills 4 in Tuusula, Finland.
 April 27 – The Tōyō Rapid Railway Line, connecting Nishi-Funabashi and Katsutadai opens in Chiba Prefecture, Japan. 
 April 28 – Further British train operating companies begin operation of their passenger service franchises as part of the privatisation of British Rail: Gatwick Express and Midland Mainline (both National Express) and Great North Eastern Railway (Sea Containers).

May events 
 May 4 – Purchase by the Dakota, Minnesota and Eastern Railroad of the former Chicago & North Western branch lines from Rapid City, South Dakota to Colony, Wyoming and Crawford, Nebraska becomes effective.
 May 12 – The Green Line of the Chicago Transit Authority elevated and subway rail system, returns to service after a $400 million, 2½-year reconstruction period. Many station facilities were still incomplete, while several other stations (including, Halsted/Lake, 58th, 61st, Racine, and University/63rd) were closed indefinitely.
 May 17 – Canadian National's Beachburg Subdivision between Pembroke and Nipissing, 126 miles ( km) of track which traversed Algonquin Provincial Park, is officially abandoned.
 May 20 – The British railway infrastructure management company, Railtrack, is privatised, being floated on the London Stock Exchange with shares worth 360p.
 May 26 – Further British train operating companies begin operation of their passenger service franchises in England as part of the privatisation of British Rail: Connex South Central and LTS Rail (a subsidiary of Prism Rail).

June events
 June 2 – First part of the Belgian High Speed line (HSL 1, from Antoing to the French Border) put into service, continuing the French LGV Nord.
 June 26 – The Atlanta & St Andrews Bay Railroad and the A&G Railroad merge to form the Bay Line Railroad.

July events
 July 21 – British train operating company Chiltern Railways begins operation of its passenger service franchise in England as part of the privatisation of British Rail, following a management buyout.
 July 24 – The Dehiwala train bombing carried out by the LTTE kills 64 people.
 July 27 – Ron Burns becomes president of Union Pacific.
 July 28 – The Talleyr and Terminal Railroad (a subsidiary of Genesee & Wyoming) begins operations in Jacksonville, Florida.
 July 31 – Canadian Pacific makes the last run of a grain load in a  boxcar with the final deliveries of grain to Thunder Bay, Ontario.
 July 31 – The first low-floor light rail car in North America is received (from its manufacturer, Siemens) by Portland, Oregon's TriMet.

August events
 August 19 – Metra's North Central Service commuter rail line begins operations on the Milwaukee District/West Line and on the Wisconsin Central Railroad between Union Station in downtown Chicago and Antioch.

September events 
 September 11 – Union Pacific finishes the acquisition that was effectively begun almost a century before with the purchase of the Southern Pacific. The merged company retains the name "Union Pacific" for all railroad operations.
 September 14 – The York–Durham Heritage Railway begins operations on Canadian National's former branch between Uxbridge and Stouffville, Ontario.

October events
 October 1 – The Norwegian Railway Inspectorate is created.
 October 13 – Further British train operating companies begin operation of their passenger service franchises as part of the privatisation of British Rail: Cardiff Railway Company (operating as Valley Lines) and Wales & West (both subsidiaries of Prism Rail); Connex South Eastern; Island Line, Isle of Wight (Stagecoach Group); and Thames Trains (Go-Ahead Group).
 October – The first stage of Cairo Metro's Line Two (the Yellow line) opens.

November events
 November 18 – Channel Tunnel fire seriously damaging 200 m of the tunnel's lining.
 November 21 – Limited freight service in the Channel Tunnel resumes while construction crews make repairs at the location of the fire three days earlier.

December events
 December 1 – Norwegian State Railways is split into the Norwegian National Rail Administration and Norges Statsbaner.
 December 4 – Passenger service resumes through the Channel Tunnel.
 December 5
 BNSF reopens Stampede Pass in Washington and resumes operating freight trains over the line.
 Canadian National operates its last train of grain to be hauled in 40 ft (12 m) boxcars; CN SD40s numbered 5256 and 5051 depart Canora, Saskatchewan, with a train of 114 such boxcars bound for Winnipeg, Manitoba, and Thunder Bay, Ontario.
 December 30
 Dallas Area Rapid Transit opens the first line of Trinity Railway Express between Dallas and Irving, Texas.
 The Brahmaputra Mail train bombing: a bomb explodes a train travelling in Lower Assam in Eastern India, totally destroying three carriages of the train and derailing six more, killing at least 33 people.
 December 31 – Burlington Northern and the Atchison, Topeka & Santa Fe Railway merge to form BNSF.

Accidents

Deaths

January deaths 
 January 3 – Terence Cuneo, British railway artist (born 1907).

May deaths 
 May 9 – Carl Fallberg, cartoonist who created Fiddletown & Copperopolis (born 1915).

References